Gypsy Heart is the fifth studio album by American singer-songwriter Colbie Caillat. It was released on September 30, 2014 by Republic Records. It was produced by American record producer Babyface. It features songwriting collaborations with past co-writer, Jason Reeves, as well as new co-writers and producers Max Martin, Julian Bunetta, and Johan Carlsson. "Try" was released as the first and only single on June 9 to the 16.

Background
Caillat wrote a full-length album in 2013, only to be told by her record company that she needed to find a new sound for her next album. She wrote over 60 songs for the album. In November 2013, she released the song "Hold On" as the intended lead single for the then-upcoming album. However, the song failed to connect with fans as well as hoped, and was ultimately left off the standard release of Gypsy Heart. To change the musical direction of the album, "Try" was selected instead to serve as the lead single for the Gypsy Heart (Side A) EP preceding the full album's release. Caillat describes the single "Try" as a "venting experience" after being told what she could and couldn't do for her own music. "To be told that your work isn't good enough – to do better, to be more like those pop artists out there that dress sexy and use Auto-tune on their voices – to be compared to someone so different, it hurt," she told Billboard. On June 9, she released Gypsy Heart (Side A), which contains the first five songs of the album. She stated to Billboard that she had wanted to release only a few songs because she thought "12 songs [were] too much to listen to at once".

Music and songs
Sonically, the EP is a musical departure from Caillat's previous releases, with a more produced sound. She stated in an interview with Fuse TV that working with new producers helped her "get out of [her] comfort zone". All of the songs on Gypsy Heart (Side A) are more produced than her usual releases, except for "Try". She describes the EP as "a fun new way to put out music", and as a blend of pop, folk, and R&B music. Of her collaboration with Babyface, Caillat says that "he just knows how to make the sound so crisp, and real, and current."

Singles
"Try" was released as the album's second single worldwide and lead single in United States on the day of the release of the EP, and a lyric video was released the following day featuring fans, as well as female celebrities such as Hoda Kotb, Miranda Lambert, Sara Bareilles, Katharine McPhee and the members of Fifth Harmony without makeup. The official video shows Caillat along with other women with makeup, which they remove later on in the video.

Other songs
"Hold On" was released originally as lead single on November 19, 2013. But, in 2014, the song wasn't included in the standart version of the album for uncertain reasons and replaced by "Try" as lead single. "Hold On" was included in Europeian version of the album. "Just Like That" was released as promotional single on September 9.

Promotion
Caillat embarked on the "Gypsy Heart Tour" to promote the album in the summer of 2014. The first stop was on July 17, 2014 in Saratoga, California.

Critical reception

The album received generally positive reviews from critics. Stephen Thomas Erlewine from AllMusic wrote that "she radiates good vibes so strongly, none of her calculated commercial considerations feels cold. And, as the sleekly modern Gypsy Heart proves, her charms are beguiling no matter her setting," giving the album 3.5 out of 5 stars and highlighted the tracks: "Live It Up", "Blaze", "Try", and "Bigger Love". Serena Weiss from The Ithacan stated that "Gypsy Heart can best be described as charming, with its hints of varying style in each song," and said that "the California singer has rendered a delightful album that will consistently intrigue listeners," while giving the album 3 out of 4 stars. Markos Papadatos from Digital Journal gave the album even more positive review, said that "Colbie Caillat delivers on her latest album Gypsy Heart. Her songwriting is warm and sincere, and her vocals are gentle and heartfelt," and awarded the album 4.5 out 5 stars.

On a less positive note, Jamie Parmenter from Renowned for Sound gave a mixed review and said that "despite the often predictable big choruses in most of the songs, the tracks are well thought out and work in their own right, it's just there’s too much unoriginality," and called it a "safe album" in which "Colbie almost seems scared to try something new and different."

Commercial performance
The album debuted at No. 17 on the Billboard 200 for chart dated October 18, 2014, with 16,000 copies sold in the first week.  The album has sold 91,000 copies in the United States as of October 2016.

Track listing
Songwriting credits derived from iTunes track data.

Charts

References

2014 albums
Colbie Caillat albums
Universal Republic Records albums
Albums produced by Babyface (musician)
Albums produced by Toby Gad
Albums produced by Max Martin
Albums produced by Ryan Tedder
Albums produced by Johan Carlsson